Ali Bey Këlcyra (May 28, 1891 – September 24, 1963) born Ali Klissura, was an Albanian lord and a member of the Albanian parliament in the 1920s. He was co-founder with Mid'hat Frashëri of the Balli Kombëtar organization in 1942, and the cosigner of the Dalmazzo-Këlcyra agreement with Lorenzo Dalmazzo.

Biography

Early life
Këlcyra was born in Këlcyrë on 28 May 1891, to Xhemal bey Klissura and Hana Luarasi. He went to grammar school in Këlcyrë and then graduated from the Galatasaray High School in Istanbul, Turkey (then Ottoman Empire). He then studied political and administrative sciences at the Mülkiye school in Istanbul.

After the beginning of World War I he returned to Këlcyrë.  During the Greek Invasion of Albania in 1914 he went to Vlorë along with other emigrants. He met there with Prince Von Wied and the princess Sophie who had come to visit the emigrants. He left the country to go to San Demetrio Corone, an Arbëreshë settlement in Calabria, Italy.

Period in Italy
In 1915 he enrolled at the Faculty of Jurisprudence at La Sapienza University in Rome. While in Rome, he was exposed to social democratic ideas and began to embrace them. During his tertiary education, he befriended Avni Rustemi and Stavro Vinjau. He graduated in 1919 and returned to Albania one year later along with Themistokli Gërmenji and others to join the Albanian guerrilla movement to fight for Albanian freedom in World War I.

Return to Albania
In 1920 he went to Vlorë and participated in the creation of the “National Defense” organization. The organization had decided to fight the Italian invaders that were holding Albanian territories under the secret Treaty of London (1915). As a result, the Italian Command under Settimo Piacentini expelled him from the Italian-held territories.

Këlcyra participated in the Congress of Lushnje, and was elected a member of the Albanian Parliament as a deputy of Gjirokastër. He represented the People’s Party where he supported Fan Noli but was less reform-oriented, despite his basic social democratic orientation. He supported agrarian reform, endeavored to persuade large landowners to give up some of their land and supported equality for women. Këlcyra is remembered in particular as a great speaker who used his rhetorical skills to attack Ahmet Zogu and his cohorts.

Exile
Këlcyra fled the country after the fall of the Noli government in the late December 1924 and headed the émigré Bashkimi Kombetar (National Unity) organisation, according to his daughter founded in Bari in 1925, and according to Sejfi Vllamasi's memoirs and very likely, in Vienna. The Zogist regime sentenced him to death in absentia on several occasions. In 1938, he was closely associated with Mustafa Kruja and his Zara (Zadar) group (Grupi i Xarës) of Albanian emigrants and, as an anti-Zogist, was not openly opposed to the Italian occupation of Albania in April 1939. In 1942 he was a member of the Council of State and was virulently anti-Greek and anti-Yugoslav.

During his stay in Paris, Ali Këlcyra wrote in Le Quotidien and Le Matin reporting on the situation in Albania and on the pro-fascist politics of Ahmet Zogu.

Second World War
In 1942 he returned to Albania and, along with Mit'hat Frashëri, co-founded the Balli Kombëtar organization. His name is remembered in particular in connection with the so-called Dalmazzo-Këlcyra Agreement of 5 March 1943 that foresaw a ceasefire between Balli Kombëtar and Italian forces in Albania. In mid-October 1944, during the communist takeover, he fled from Shkodër to Brindisi in southern Italy with Midhat Frashëri, Hasan Dosti, Kadri Cakrani and Koço Muka in a boat provided by the Abwehr. It was a horrendous five-day journey mostly without food and water. In Italy he was interned for almost two years by the British.

Final exile and death
Together with Mid’hat bey Frashëri, he endeavored to keep the anti-communist Balli Kombëtar alive from abroad until it inevitably split into various factions and lost its significance. Këlcyra later broadcast Albanian-language news programs from the West; he died in Rome.

Notes and references

1891 births
1963 deaths
People from Këlcyrë
Albanian Sufis
Albanian politicians
Albanian anti-communists
Galatasaray High School alumni
Balli Kombëtar
Sapienza University of Rome alumni
Bektashi Order